Ralph Yandell (29 March 1892 – 20 July 1982) was a British gymnast. He competed in the men's team all-around event at the 1920 Summer Olympics.

References

1892 births
1982 deaths
British male artistic gymnasts
Olympic gymnasts of Great Britain
Gymnasts at the 1920 Summer Olympics
Sportspeople from Bristol